Stephen Michael Rehage (born November 6, 1963) is a former American football cornerback who played one season for the New York Giants.

Early life
Steve Rehage was born on November 6, 1963 in New Orleans, Louisiana. He went to high school at Alfred Bonnabel High School.

College career
Rehage went to college at LSU. He played 11 games each year from 1983 to 1986. He had 4 interceptions in 1985.

Professional career
New York Giants

In 1987 he was a replacement player for the New York Giants. He played in three games and had one interception.

Ottawa Rough Riders

He played 7 games for the Ottawa Rough Riders in 1988. He had one interception.

References

1963 births
Players of American football from New Orleans
New York Giants players
LSU Tigers football players
American football cornerbacks
Ottawa Rough Riders players
Living people
National Football League replacement players